The Olteț is a right tributary of the river Olt in Romania. It discharges into the Olt in Fălcoiu.

Towns and villages

The following towns and villages are situated along the river Olteț, from source to mouth: Polovragi, Alunu, Sinești, Livezi, Zătreni, Bălcești, Laloșu, Morunglav, Balș, Bârza, Pârșcoveni, Osica de Sus, Fălcoiu.

Tributaries

The following rivers are tributaries to the river Olteț (from source to mouth):

Left: Urlieșu, Dracu, Cujba, Lespezi, Savu, Pârâul Rău, Tărâia, Tulburea, Budele, Șasa, Cerna, Laloș, Bârlui, Balta Dascălului
Right: Ungurel, Cornățel, Valea Iezerului, Obislav, Peșteana, Aninoasa, Călui, Valea Românei, Geamărtălui, Voineasa Mare, Pârâul Roșu, Bobu

References

 
Rivers of Romania
Rivers of Gorj County
Rivers of Vâlcea County
Rivers of Olt County